Gate I is the fourth album released by Japanese pop rock trio Iceman. It was released on May 21, 1998. It is also the second in a small series of albums released by Iceman from 1999 until their official departure from the Japanese music scene in 2003. This series includes three studio albums (Gate II, Gate I, and Gate//White), as well as 1 remix album and 1 “analog” album (gate out - 1st remix album and gate out - 1st analog album, respectively).  Track 8 on this album, “Gate I”, was also rerecorded by Daisuke Asakura and released as a single, being part of his 2008 project “Da Metaverse ~100 songs for 1000 days~".

Track listing

References
 Family fansite
 Album Artwork 

1999 albums
Iceman (Japanese band) albums